Grebeshkov is a Russian male surname, its feminine counterpart is Grebeshkova. Notable people with the surname include:

Denis Grebeshkov (born 1983), Russian ice hockey defenceman
Nina Grebeshkova (born 1930), Russian actress

Russian-language surnames